Kadir İnanır (born 15 April 1949) is a Turkish film actor and director.

Biography
İnanır was born on 15 April 1949 in Fatsa, a town in Ordu province of Turkey. He acted in 43 films since 1967 and appeared on television in Bütün Çocuklarım as Ali Yahya Kiroglu in 2004. In the Turkish movie industry (Yeşilçam) he has often portrayed the tough, macho guy, fighting against injustice. Kadir İnanır and Türkan Şoray are one of the most famous partners of Yeşilçam Turkish cinema.

During a 2013 visit to Kosovo, İnanır had a meeting with the Kosovan Minister of Culture Memli Krasniqi who was encouraging cultural and cinematographical cooperation between Kosovo and Turkey. İnanır said that he encouraged the idea and would personally work on the implementation of such a cooperation.

Filmography

Movies

TV series
 1992: Savcı

Director
 1991: Ah Gardaşım
 1992: Savcı

References

 Biography of Kadir İnanır at Biyografi.info

External links
 

1949 births
Living people
People from Fatsa
Turkish male television actors
Turkish male film actors
Haydarpaşa High School alumni
Best Actor Golden Boll Award winners
Best Actor Golden Orange Award winners
Golden Orange Life Achievement Award winners
Golden Butterfly Award winners